HDOS is an early microcomputer operating system, originally written for the Heathkit H8 computer system and later also available for the Heathkit H89 and Zenith Z-89 computers. The author was Heath Company employee Gordon Letwin, who later was an early employee of Microsoft and lead architect of OS/2.

HDOS originally came with a limited set of system software tools, including an assembler, but many commercial and large set of freeware programs from HUG (Heath User Group) became available for it eventually.

HDOS 2.0 is notable because it was one of the first microcomputer operating systems to use loadable device drivers to achieve a degree of device independence and extensibility. Device names followed the RSX-11-style convention of DKn: where the first two letters were the device driver file name and n was a number (DK0:, DK1:, and so on would all be handled by DK.SYS).  Other similarities to RSX included the use of PIP for file transfer, and the use of EOT for file termination.

Similar to how Heath/Zenith published complete schematics and part lists for its computers, the company sold to users the source code for HDOS. The full source paper listing is held at yesterpc.org, old computer museum. Item references (Heathkit part number) are HOS-1-SL part number 595–2466.

Commands
The following list of commands are supported by HDOS.

 BOOT
 BYE
 CAT
 COPY
 DATE
 DELETE
 DISMOUNT
 FLAGS
 HELP
 MOUNT
 ONECOPY
 PIP
 RENAME
 RUN
 SET
 STAT
 STATUS
 TYPE
 VER

Versions
HDOS 1.0 – written in 1978 by J. Gordon Letwin
HDOS 1.5 – Gregg Chandler
HDOS 1.6 – Gregg Chandler
HDOS 2.0 – released in 1980, written by Gregg Chandler, released into the public domain in April 1988
HDOS 3.0 – released into the public domain in August 1986
HDOS 3.02 – enhanced version by Richard Musgrave

See also

Heathkit
Zenith Data Systems
List of operating systems

References

External links
HeathDOS
Michael A. Pechuria, Comparing Two Microcomputer Operating Systems: CP/M and HDOS. Communications of the ACM, March 1983, vol. 26, no.  3.
 Society of Eight-Bit Heathkit Computerists A web site dedicated to preserving the Heathkit 8-bit computers, source listing in PDF form

Free software operating systems
Public-domain software with source code
1978 software